Burbank Airport–North station is a Metrolink rail station in the city of Burbank, California. Passengers on the Antelope Valley Line, which travels between Lancaster, California and Union Station in downtown Los Angeles, can connect with the Hollywood Burbank Airport. Metrolink ticket holders can also ride Los Angeles Metro Bus routes between the station and the terminal for free.

The station was given the name Bob Hope Airport–Hollywood Way during planning, but the name was changed prior to opening.

History 
In 2013, an environmental study was conducted as a prerequisite before construction could begin. Groundbreaking for the station was held on June 21, 2013. A Los Angeles County Metropolitan Transportation Authority factsheet dated April 2, 2015, said that construction was scheduled to begin in July 2015 with operations in April 2016. By March 2017, construction had begun on the station. Revenue service began May 14, 2018.

Connections 
Hollywood Burbank Airport Shuttle 
Los Angeles Metro Bus: ,

Future 

A planned California High-Speed Rail station will be located underground or below grade adjacent to the existing station. That service will initially operate between Los Angeles Union Station and the San Francisco 4th and King Street station with a planned start in 2033.

References 

Buildings and structures in Burbank, California
Public transportation in the San Fernando Valley
Railway stations in the United States opened in 2018
Metrolink stations in Los Angeles County, California
Airport railway stations in the United States
2018 establishments in California